During the 1999–2000 season, Leeds United A.F.C. competed in the FA Premier League (known as the FA Carling Premiership for sponsorship reasons).

Season summary
After a promising previous season, good times looked to be on the horizon for David O'Leary and his young team in his first full season in charge, even after losing their previous season's top scorer Jimmy Floyd Hasselbaink to Spanish side Atletico Madrid. O'Leary added more young quality to his squad, defenders Michael Duberry and Danny Mills were signed from Chelsea and Charlton respectively. Midfielders Eirik Bakke and Jason Wilcox also joined, along with striker Michael Bridges. 

Leeds had a tough start in the league, wins over Southampton and newly promoted Sunderland were each followed with losses to Liverpool and Manchester United, but a 2–1 win at Tottenham saw Leeds begin a record of 10 straight wins at home. Leeds stormed to the top of the Premiership, with new striker Michael Bridges and Harry Kewell scoring regularly, but in the New Year star players Lee Bowyer and Jonathan Woodgate were involved in an off the pitch incident in Leeds city centre, a saga which was to hamper the club for the next few years. In the meantime, Leeds made relatively early exits from both domestic cup competitions, going out of the League Cup to eventual winners Leicester City, and the FA Cup to eventual runners-up Aston Villa.

Defeats to Manchester United and Liverpool saw Leeds lose ground in the title race; however, Leeds were progressing well in the UEFA Cup and reached the semi final against Turkish side Galatasaray. However two Leeds supporters were stabbed to death in clashes before the game; the deaths clearly affected Leeds on the pitch that night, and they lost the first leg of the tie 2–0. A 2–2 draw in the return leg meant Leeds were knocked out of the UEFA Cup.

Domestically, four consecutive league defeats almost ended hopes of finishing in the top three, but Leeds recovered well enough to go into the final day in third place, leaving them needing to better Liverpool's result in order to secure Champions League football. While Leeds could only draw, their neighbours Bradford City did them a huge favour by unexpectedly defeating Liverpool, securing not only their own top-flight survival, but third place for Leeds. Champions League qualification capped off an overall successful season for Leeds, and seemingly provided a platform for the club to build on going forwards.

Final league table

Results summary

Results by round

Results

Premier League

FA Cup

League Cup

UEFA Cup

First round

Second round

Third round

Fourth round

Quarter-finals

Semi-finals

First-team squad
Squad at end of season

Left club during season

Reserve squad
The following players did not appear for the first team this season.

Appearances, goals and cards
(Starting appearances + substitute appearances)

Transfers

In

Out

Loaned out

Notes

References

Leeds United F.C. seasons
Leeds United
Foot